Samuel Lovett Waldo (April 6, 1783 – February 16, 1861) was an American portrait painter.

Early life & studies
Waldo was born on April 6, 1783 in Windham, Connecticut, the son of Esther and Zacheus Waldo. At the age of sixteen, he moved to Hartford to begin his formal art training under the tutelage of Joseph Steward, a prominent local artist.

Four years later, he set up shop as a portraitist in Hartford, later relocating to Litchfield, Connecticut. While in Hartford, he had made the acquaintance of congressman John Rutledge, Jr., who was impressed with his work and, in 1803, invited him to come to Charleston, South Carolina. From 1803 to 1805, Waldo earned a sizable income from his commissions and decided that he would use the money to study art in London. He studied under Benjamin West in London.

He arrived in London in 1806 with letters of introduction to Benjamin West and John Singleton Copley. While studying with them, he also studied drawing at the Royal Academy and exhibited a portrait there in 1808.

Between his artistic activities, he met and married Elizabeth Wood of Liverpool in 1808. Together they had five children that survived infancy. Elizabeth died in 1825 and the following year, on 9 May 1826, he married Deliverance Mapes and had seven more children.

Later career and activities
In 1809, he returned to the United States and established a portrait studio in New York City.

Three years later William Jewett (d. 24 March 1874), a young coach painter from New London, Connecticut who wanted to be a fine artist, approached Waldo and asked to be taken in as an apprentice. Waldo agreed and allowed him to live with his family during his time of study. In 1818, they entered into a formal partnership which lasted until 1854, when Jewett retired. As a team, it is generally believed that Waldo painted the head and hands of their subjects, while Jewett filled in the clothing and draperies.

In addition to his painting, Waldo served as a director of the American Academy of the Fine Arts from 1817 until its dissolution in 1841. He was also a founding member of the National Academy of Design.

Death and legacy 
He died in New York City on February 16, 1861, and was buried at Green-Wood Cemetery.

Waldo's work is found in many public museum collections, including at the Montgomery Museum of Fine Arts.

Selected portraits

See also 

 
 Portrait painting

References

1783 births
1861 deaths
People from Windham, Connecticut
19th-century American painters
19th-century American male artists
American male painters
National Academy of Design faculty
National Academy of Design members
Burials at Green-Wood Cemetery